13 Men and a Gun is a 1938 British-Italian war film directed by Mario Zampi and starring Arthur Wontner, Clifford Evans and Howard Marion-Crawford. It is an English-language version of the Italian film Tredici uomini e un cannone.

Premise
During the First World War, Russian forces attempt to take out an Austrian artillery position.

Cast
 Arthur Wontner as Captain
 Clifford Evans as Jorg
 Howard Marion-Crawford as Kramer
 Allan Jeayes as General Vloty
 Gibb McLaughlin as Colonel Vlatin
 Wally Patch as Hans
 Scott Harold as Ludwig
 Donald Gray as Johann
 Bernard Miles as Schultz
 André Morell as Kroty
 John Kevan as Peder

References

External links

1938 films
British war films
World War I films set on the Eastern Front
British multilingual films
British black-and-white films
Italian black-and-white films
1938 war films
1938 multilingual films
1930s English-language films
1930s British films
1930s Italian films